Harold Bentley Jeffcoat (September 6, 1924 – August 30, 2007) was an American professional baseball player who forged a 12-season, 918-game Major League Baseball career, first as an outfielder (1948–1953) and then as a right-handed pitcher (1954–1959) as a member of the Chicago Cubs (1948–1955), Cincinnati Redlegs and Reds (1956–1959), and St. Louis Cardinals (1959). He was the younger brother by 11 years of former major league pitcher George Jeffcoat.

Jeffcoat served in the United States Army during World War II before his baseball career began. A paratrooper, he saw combat during the Italian Campaign, where he was wounded; he was awarded a Purple Heart as a result. He entered professional baseball in 1946, and in his second year, he led the 1947 Double-A Southern Association in base hits (218) and knocked in 118 runs, despite striking only four home runs all season. His major league career began with the Cubs the following year.

Career
As a hitter in the majors, in 1,963 at-bats, Jeffcoat scored 249 runs and collected 487 hits, including 95 doubles, 18 triples, 26 home runs, 696 total bases, 188 runs batted in, 49 stolen bases and 114 bases on balls received. He batted .248, with a .291 on-base percentage and .355 slugging percentage. Jeffcoat also had 47 sacrifice hits and two sacrifice flies.

Jeffcoat converted from outfielder to pitcher in  while playing for the Cubs. He worked in 43 games pitched that season, all but three in relief, and would log only four more games in the outfield for the remainder of his major league career. In his debut year on the mound, he won five of 11 decisions and earned seven saves, leading the club. In 104 innings pitched, he posted a poor 5.19 earned run average.

His most successful seasons as a pitcher came from 1955 through 1957. Overall, in 245 MLB games pitched, with 51 games started, he posted a win–loss record of 39–37, with 13 complete games, one shutout (a 3–0 six-hitter against the Brooklyn Dodgers at Ebbets Field on June 9, 1957), with 25 saves. In 697 innings pitched, he allowed 772 hits, 365 runs, 327 earned runs, 73 home runs and 257 walks, with 239 strikeouts, 22 hit batsmen, 13 wild pitches, 3,053 batters faced, 35 intentional walks and a 4.22 career earned run average. He is also remembered as the pitcher who beaned Brooklyn's Don Zimmer on June 23, 1956, fracturing Zimmer's cheekbone and ending his season.

Personal life
Jeffcoat married Valma Viola Ala, who he met while she served as a member of the Women’s Auxiliary Army Corps, in 1946. They had three sons together, including Harold George Jeffcoat, who would go on to have a ten-year minor league career before having an academic career during which he served as the president of Texas Wesleyan University and Millikin University.

Jeffcoat died in Tampa, Florida in 2007 after suffering a stroke.

References

External links

Biography at Baseball in Wartime.com

1924 births
2007 deaths
United States Army personnel of World War II
Baseball players from Columbia, South Carolina
Burials at Florida National Cemetery
Chicago Cubs players
Cincinnati Reds players
Major League Baseball center fielders
Major League Baseball pitchers
Nashville Vols players
St. Louis Cardinals players
Seattle Rainiers players
Shelby Cubs players
United States Army soldiers
Paratroopers